The Izvoru oil field is an oil field located in Izvoru, Argeș County. It was discovered in 1968 and developed by Petrom. It began production in 1980 and produces oil.

References

Oil fields in Romania